Inside Llewyn Davis is a 2013 American comedy-drama film written, directed and edited by Joel and Ethan Coen. The film stars Oscar Isaac, Carey Mulligan, and John Goodman, and was produced by Scott Rudin, and Ethan and Joel Coen. T Bone Burnett was the executive music producer. The story is about a week in the life of a singer-songwriter who is active in New York's folk music scene in 1961. Although Llewyn Davis is a fictional character, the story was partly inspired by the autobiography of folk singer Dave Van Ronk. The folk songs performed in the film are all sung in full, and, with one exception, were recorded live.

The film premiered at the 2013 Cannes Film Festival on May 19, where it won the Grand Prix. The film then began a limited release at four theatres on December 6, 2013, before later going on wide release at over 700 theatres on January 10, 2014 in the United States and Canada, by CBS Films. The film has grossed a worldwide total of over $32 million on a budget of $17 million. Upon release, review aggregator Rotten Tomatoes surveyed 233 reviews and judged 95 percent to be positive.

At the 86th Academy Awards, Inside Llewyn Davis was nominated for Best Cinematography and Best Sound Mixing, but lost both to Gravity. At the 67th British Academy Film Awards, it was nominated in three categories: Best Original Screenplay, Best Cinematography and Best Sound, but it failed to win any. At the 70th Golden Globe Awards, it was nominated for Best Motion Picture – Musical or Comedy, Best Performance by an Actor in a Motion Picture – Musical or Comedy, and Best Original Song and again won nothing.

At the 18th Satellite Awards, it had six nominations, winning for Best Cinematography. Inside Llewyn Davis was also nominated for three Independent Spirit Awards: Best Feature, Best Male Lead and Best Cinematography. Both the National Board of Review and the American Film Institute included the film in their list of top ten films of 2013.

Accolades

 Each date is linked to the article about the awards held that year whenever possible.

See also

2013 in film

Notes

References

External links 
 

Lists of accolades by film